Craig Hinchliffe (born 5 May 1972) is a Scottish former professional footballer who played as a goalkeeper. He is currently the goalkeeping coach at Dundee United.

Playing career
Hinchliffe made one Scottish Football League (SFL) appearance for Albion Rovers in the 1991/92 season, before moving to Highland League club Elgin City. In 1995, he moved back into the SFL with Arbroath, where he made nearly 200 appearances for the club. In the summer of 2003 he transferred to St Mirren and made 70 appearances, including several in their promotion season in 2005–06. In the 2006–07 season, he played a handful of games for Queen of the South during a loan spell at the Dumfries club.

In the summer of 2007, he signed for Partick Thistle as goalkeeper and goalkeeper coach. Thistle's manager, Ian McCall, had also signed Hinchliffe (on loan) for Queen of the South.  He was released at the end of the 2009/10 season but rejoined in a player-coach role in time for the 2010/11 season.

Coaching career
In April 2011, Hinchliffe continued his role under the new management team of Jackie McNamara and Simon Donnelly. McNamara and Donnelly left Partick Thistle in January 2013, with the club sitting in 2nd place, to join Dundee United. Hinchliffe worked closely with new caretaker manager Alan Archibald. Archibald later guided Thistle to the Championship gaining the Jags promotion to the Scottish Premiership with a 16-game unbeaten run. Despite Thistle's attempts to secure Hinchliffe's services he opted to rejoin Jackie McNamara and Simon Donnelly at Dundee United, signing a three-year deal in time for season 2013–2014. Hinchliffe left Dundee United in September 2015, following McNamara's departure. In November 2015 he was appointed as goalkeeping coach at Airdrieonians, but a month later reunited with McNamara at League Two club York City. Returning to Scotland, he became goalkeeping coach at Motherwell in June 2017.
On 13 May, after 5 successful seasons at Motherwell working with Trevor Carson, Mark Gillespie and Liam Kelly, Hinchliffe returned to Dundee Utd for a second spell under Thomas Courts.Before the 22/23 SPFL season began Courts left the club.

Honours
St Mirren
Scottish Challenge Cup: 2005–06

References

External links

1972 births
Living people
Footballers from Glasgow
Scottish footballers
Association football goalkeepers
Albion Rovers F.C. players
Elgin City F.C. players
Arbroath F.C. players
St Mirren F.C. players
Queen of the South F.C. players
Partick Thistle F.C. players
Scottish Football League players
Dundee United F.C. non-playing staff
York City F.C. non-playing staff
Highland Football League players
Motherwell F.C. non-playing staff
Partick Thistle F.C. non-playing staff